Henry Lauterbach (born 22 October 1957 in Buttstädt, Bezirk Erfurt) is a retired East German high jumper and long jumper.

In the high jump he finished fourth at the 1978 European Championships in Prague, Czechoslovakia and sixth at the 1979 European Indoor Championships in Vienna, Austria. He competed at the 1976 Olympic Games, but did not reach the final round; at the 1980 Olympic Games however he finished fourth. With a jump of 2.29 metres he missed out on the bronze medal by 2 centimetres; the bronze and gold medals were won by his compatriots Jörg Freimuth and Gerd Wessig respectively. Lauterbach was ranked sixth in the world that season by Track and Field News.

In domestic competitions, Lauterbach represented the sports club SC Turbine Erfurt. He won silver medals at the East German championships in 1976, 1977, 1978 and 1980 and a bronze medal in 1981. The East German champion during those years was usually Rolf Beilschmidt. Lauterbach became East German indoor champion in 1979.

Lauterbach had a personal best high jump of 2.30 metres, achieved in August 1978 in Potsdam.

Lauterbach also competed in the long jump on an international level, winning the gold medal at the 1982 European Indoor Championships in Milan, Italy. His winning result of 7.86 metres has been improved in all of the later editions of the European Indoor Championships. On the national level Lauterbach won silver medals in this event at the East German championships in 1970, 1972, 1976 and 1981. Additionally he won a bronze medal in 1974. He became East German indoor champion in 1982.

His personal best long jump was 8.35 metres, achieved in August 1981 in Erfurt. This ranks him third among German long jumpers, behind Olympic medalists Lutz Dombrowski and Frank Paschek, and equal to Josef Schwarz.

Notes and references

External links

1957 births
Living people
People from Buttstädt
People from Bezirk Erfurt
East German male high jumpers
East German male long jumpers
Sportspeople from Thuringia
Olympic athletes of East Germany
Athletes (track and field) at the 1976 Summer Olympics
Athletes (track and field) at the 1980 Summer Olympics